William Walter Wiedrich (August 19, 1931 in Stambaugh, Michigan – November 26, 2014 in Muskegon, Michigan) was suffragan bishop of the Episcopal Diocese of Chicago. He was ordained a deacon in 1956 and a priest in 1957 in the  Episcopal Diocese of Northern Michigan by the Right Reverend Herman R. Page Jr. He was consecrated on February 23, 1991, and retired on December 31, 1996.

External links 
Death notice from The Living Church
RIP: Former Chicago Bishop Suffragan William Wiedrich

1931 births
2014 deaths
20th-century American Episcopalians
Episcopal bishops of Chicago